John Myler Frederick Barnes (21 February 1921 – 13 May 1996) was an Australian rules footballer who played with South Melbourne and Hawthorn in the Victorian Football League (VFL).

Barnes also served in the Royal Australian Air Force during World War II.

References

External links 

1921 births
1996 deaths
Australian rules footballers from Melbourne
Sydney Swans players
Hawthorn Football Club players
Royal Australian Air Force personnel of World War II
People from Box Hill, Victoria
Military personnel from Melbourne